is a Japanese figure skater and ice show producer. He is a two-time Olympic champion (2014, 2018), a two-time World champion (2014, 2017), a four-time Grand Prix Final champion (2013–2016), the 2020 Four Continents champion, the 2010 World Junior champion, the 2009–10 Junior Grand Prix Final champion, and a six-time Japanese national champion (2012–2015, 2020–2021). He has also medaled at five other World Championships, taking bronze in 2012 and 2021, and silver in 2015, 2016 and 2019, making him the only male single skater along with Jan Hoffmann to win seven world championship medals in the post-World War II era. 

Having been called one of the greatest figure skaters in history by many sport writers, commentators, and skaters for his well-rounded skills, achievements, popularity, and impact on the sport, Hanyu is the first men's singles skater to achieve a Super Slam, having won all major competitions in both his senior and junior careers. He has broken world records nineteen times—the most times among single skaters since the introduction of the ISU Judging System in 2004. He is the first man to have received over 100 points in the men's short program, over 200 points in the men's free skate, and over 300 total points in competition. Upon winning his first Olympic title, Hanyu became the first Asian men's singles skater to win the Olympic gold. At nineteen years old, he was the youngest male skater to win the Olympic title since Dick Button in 1948. In 2018, he became the first man to win two consecutive Olympic gold medals since Button's back-to-back titles in 1948 and 1952. At the 2016 CS Autumn Classic International, Hanyu became the first skater in history to successfully land a quadruple loop in a competition. He is the first men's singles skater from Asia to win multiple World Championships.

In recognition of his achievements, Hanyu became the youngest recipient of the People's Honor Award, bestowed by the Prime Minister of Japan for "giving dreams and thrills to the people and hope and courage to society". He is the first figure skater to be nominated for the Laureus World Sports Award and was named the Most Valuable Skater by the inaugural ISU Skating Awards in 2020. Hanyu also has been featured in prestigious lists, such as Forbes''' 30 Under 30 Asia as well as ESPN's World Fame 100 and The Dominant 20. In 2022, Hanyu was ranked sixth in the list of most-searched athletes on Google Search worldwide. The same year, on July 19, Hanyu announced his decision to turn professional and "step away" from competitive figure skating after a 12-year long senior career, which according to Nikkei Asia "marks the end of an era" in competition.

Family and early life
Yuzuru Hanyu was born on December 7, 1994, in Izumi ward, Sendai, Japan, as the second and younger child to father Hidetoshi Hanyu, a junior high school teacher, and mother Yumi Hanyu, a former clerk at a department store. Hanyu's given name  was chosen by his father, wishing that his son may "live a dignified life like a tightly drawn bowstring", symbolizing confidence, strength, and straightness. Hanyu's father was an advisor to the baseball school club and recommended the sport to his son, but Hanyu eventually decided to pursue a career in figure skating. His mother used to make the costumes in his early career, including the free skate costume for the 2010–11 season, which was designed by American figure skater Johnny Weir. In 2012, she moved with Hanyu to Toronto, Canada, and accompanied him during training, while his father and older sister, Saya, stayed in Japan.

At the age of two, Hanyu was diagnosed with asthma, a condition that gradually improved with time yet negatively affected his stamina, especially during his junior career. Yamada noted Hanyu's impatience when he first got onto the ice but also praised him for his sincerity. After coaching him until the end of his second grade in elementary school, Yamada had to move to another prefecture and asked , former coach of Japan's first World medalist, Minoru Sano, to train Hanyu and "not put his talent to waste". Hanyu described Tsuzuki's practice sessions as particularly strict and exhausting, tempting him to skip lessons at times, but he appreciated Tsuzuki's approach to build a solid foundation of skills and focus on basic training, noting: "He placed so much emphasis on skating and the Axel [jump]. Perhaps that made me confident to this day that the Axel is my forte."

Competitive skating career
Novice and junior career (2004–2010)
Hanyu competed as a novice skater for the first time in the 2004–05 season, winning gold at the Japan Championships in the Novice B category, the lower of the two novice level categories. On weekends, he travelled three hours from Sendai to Yokohama for additional lessons at Tsuzuki's new skating club. In summer 2006, at 11 years old, Hanyu's confidence showed up when initiating a spin battle against that year's Olympic silver medalist, Stéphane Lambiel, who was known for his world-class spins. Hanyu suffered a disarming defeat, which he remembered as an important career lesson: "After competing against him, I decided to improve my spins as well. You will definitely improve, learning from [the best]." In the 2006–07 season, Hanyu won the bronze medal at the Japan Championships in the Novice A category, which earned him an invitation to the Japan Junior Championships, where he placed seventh. His home rink in Izumi ward eventually reopened in 2007 after being closed for two years. The next season, he placed first at the Japan Championships in the Novice A category and won the bronze medal at the Japan Junior Championships.

In 2008–09, Hanyu moved up to junior level and made his international debut in the ISU Junior Grand Prix at the Merano Cup in Italy, where he placed fifth. The same season, he won gold at the Japan Junior Championships, becoming the youngest male skater with 13 years to win the event. This result earned him an invitation to compete at the Japan Senior Championships for the first time, where he placed eighth. His national junior title also qualified him for the 2009 World Junior Championships in February, where he finished in 12th place with 161.77 points in the combined total. In that season, Hanyu had included the triple Axel jump in his programs for the first time, though receiving negative grades of execution (GOE) for all three attempts. The following 2009–10 season marked the beginning of an 11-year-long quest for the first Super Slam in the men's singles discipline, with wins at the ISU Junior Grand Prix Final and World Junior Championships: Hanyu placed first at both of his Grand Prix assignments, in Poland and Croatia, and entered the Final as the top qualifier, which he won with a new personal best score of 206.77 points. At Junior Nationals, he successfully defended his title from the previous season, qualifying him for the Senior Nationals, where he finished sixth. Based on his results, Hanyu was selected to compete at the 2010 World Junior Championships, winning gold after placing third in the short program and first in the free skate with a new personal best score of 216.10 points. Hanyu became the fourth and youngest Japanese man to win the junior world title. In that season, he had significantly improved the quality of his triple Axel, having landed nine jumps with positive GOE in ten attempts.

First Olympic cycle (2010–2014)
2010–11 season: International senior debut
In the 2010–11 season, Hanyu moved up to senior level at 15 years old, facing significant competition in the Japanese men's field, including Daisuke Takahashi, Nobunari Oda, Takahiko Kozuka, and Tatsuki Machida, who all had finished ahead of him at the previous Japan Championships. Hanyu skated his short program to "White Legend" from Pyotr Tchaikovsky's ballet Swan Lake, performed by Japanese violinist Ikuko Kawai, and used the music piece Zigeunerweisen by Pablo de Sarasate for the free skate. He gave his international senior debut at the 2010 NHK Trophy, where he landed his first successful quadruple jump at an ISU-sanctioned event: a quad toe loop. He placed fourth overall at the competition and seventh at the subsequent Rostelecom Cup, missing out on a medal at his first two senior Grand Prix events. At the 2010–11 Japan Championships, he was in second place after the short program, but faltered in the free skate and finished fourth overall. The next year, at the 2011 Four Continents Championships, he won his first medal at a main international senior competition, placing second behind Daisuke Takahashi with a new personal best score of 228.01 points. At 16 years old, Hanyu became the youngest medalist at the Four Continents Championships.

On March 11, 2011, he was skating at his home rink in Sendai when the 2011 Tōhoku earthquake and tsunami struck his hometown and the Tōhoku region. With his house being damaged, he had to spend the following three days with his family at an evacuation center. A month later, on April 7, the water pipes at his rink burst as a result of an aftershock, known as the April 2011 Miyagi earthquake, and Hanyu was forced to move his training base to Yokohama and Hachinohe until his home rink reopened on July 24, 2011. In the meantime, he had participated in 60 ice shows across Japan, using them as an opportunity to get additional practice time and raise money for the areas affected by the disaster.

2011–12 season: First world medal

In the 2011–12 season, Hanyu skated his short program to Alexander Scriabin's Étude in D-sharp minor and the free skate to a medley of Romeo + Juliet by Craig Armstrong. The choreographies were created by Nanami Abe in collaboration with Natalia Bestemianova and Igor Bobrin from Russia. Hanyu opened the season at the Nebelhorn Trophy, where he won his first gold medal at an international senior competition. During the event, he shared his career goals with the media: "My goals for the future are to land all quad jumps in competition. I would also like to learn the quad Axel. Another goal is to win the next two Olympics, or at least win medals." For the 2011–12 Grand Prix series, he was assigned to the Cup of China, where he placed fourth, and the Rostelecom Cup, which he won with one of the closest margins of 0.03 points ahead of Javier Fernández from Spain. The results qualified him for his first senior Grand Prix Final, where he finished fourth. Hanyu then won the bronze medal at the Japan Championships, earning a spot on the Japanese team for the 2012 World Championships. At his senior Worlds debut, he competed on a sprained ankle, placing seventh in the short program, but with a strong free skate he moved up to third place overall, winning the bronze medal with a new personal best score of 251.06 points. He became the youngest Japanese world medalist, finishing behind then two-time world champion Patrick Chan (gold) and Daisuke Takahashi (silver). After the competition, both skaters acknowledged Hanyu as a potential strong rival in the future.

Upon the conclusion of the 2011–12 season, Hanyu changed coaches, training with Brian Orser and Tracy Wilson at the Toronto Cricket, Skating and Curling Club (Toronto CSCC) in Canada, who had coached Korean skater Yuna Kim to Olympic gold in 2010 among others. Hanyu's main motivation for the change were the consistent quadruple jumps performed by Orser's student Javier Fernández. According to Hidehito Ito, figure skating director of the Japan Skating Federation, the change was also necessary to "challenge" Hanyu and "raise the level [of his skating] more". The first months, Hanyu was making frequent trips to Toronto, but continued to attend high school in Sendai. After moving to Canada, he increased his on-ice training to 3–4 hours a day, up from 1–2 hours, which had been due to a combination of limited ice time in Sendai, schooling, and asthma.

2012–13 season: First national senior title
In the first season at his new skating club, Hanyu teamed up with two new choreographers. His short program was created by the 2008 World champion, Jeffrey Buttle, to "Parisienne Walkways" by Gary Moore and the free skate was choreographed by Canadian David Wilson to a medley of Riccardo Cocciante's musical Notre-Dame de Paris. The coaching change resulted in immediate success; At the 2012 Finlandia Trophy, Hanyu landed his first quadruple Salchow in international competition and won the event. In the Grand Prix series, he scored his first two world records in the short program with 95.07 points at the 2012 Skate America, where he finished second behind Takahiko Kozuka, and 95.32 points at the NHK Trophy, which he won ahead of Daisuke Takahashi. The placements qualified him for the Grand Prix Final, where he finished second behind Takahashi and beat Patrick Chan for the first time in competition. At the Japan Championships, Hanyu won his first national senior title, defeating the reigning and five-time national champion, Daisuke Takahashi, scoring an unofficial record of 285.23 points in the combined total. However, his win was not well received among spectators and officials, being booed on the podium, but Orser encouraged his student, saying: "They will come around. Just give it some time and they will come your way." After the 2013 Four Continents Championships, where he had finished second behind Canadian Kevin Reynolds, Hanyu suffered a knee injury and resumed training two weeks prior to the World Championships. An additional ankle sprain in practice forced him to compete on painkillers. Placing ninth after the short program, he fought back with a strong free skate, finishing fourth overall behind Patrick Chan (gold), Denis Ten (silver), and Javier Fernández (bronze), and earning a third spot for Japanese men at the 2014 Winter Olympics.

2013–14 season: First Olympic and world title

For his first Olympic season, Hanyu returned to his short program "Parisienne Walkways" and selected Nino Rota's music from Romeo and Juliet for the free skate, choreographed by David Wilson. He launched the season with a win at the 2013 Finlandia Trophy and won silver in both of his Grand Prix events, the 2013 Skate Canada and Trophée Éric Bompard, qualifying him for the 2013–14 Grand Prix Final. At the Final, he set a new world record in the short program with 99.84 points and placed first overall ahead of Patrick Chan (silver) and Nobunari Oda (bronze), winning his first major international senior title. At the Japan Championships, Hanyu went on to win a second national title and was selected to represent the Japanese team at the 2014 Winter Olympics and World Championships. At the Winter Olympics in Sochi, he participated in the men's short program of the figure skating team event, earning ten points for Team Japan. In the individual event, he broke his world record, becoming the first skater to score above 100 points in the short program with a score of 101.45. Despite two falls in the free skate, he managed to win the event with a new Olympic record of 280.09 points in the combined total, finishing ahead of Patrick Chan (silver) and Denis Ten (bronze). With his win, Hanyu became the youngest gold medalist since American Dick Button in 1948. It was the first Olympic title for an Asian skater in the men's singles event and the second for Japan in figure skating, following Shizuka Arakawa's win in the women's event in 2006 in Turin. Hanyu concluded the season with a victory at the World Championships in Saitama, Japan, defeating compatriot Tatsuki Machida with 0.33 points and becoming the first skater to win the Olympics, Worlds, and the Grand Prix Final in the same season after Russian Alexei Yagudin in 2002–01.

Second Olympic cycle (2014–2018)
2014–15 season: Second Grand Prix Final win
After the Sochi Olympics, Hanyu's coaching team was joined by jump expert Ghislain Briand who had coached Canadian skater Elvis Stojko to Olympic silver and two world titles in the 1990s. After Stojko's retirement, Briand was convinced that he would "never have the opportunity to work with another athlete with that much talent, dedication, and passion." However, with Hanyu, Briand had eventually found a student who was open towards his unconventional training and analysis of figure skating jumps, stating: "Yuzu is probably the first athlete who really recognizes what I do with him. He is the perfect model and he masters his art like no one else. It sometimes makes the job easier, but his higher level also comes with many challenges."

In the 2014–15 season, Hanyu skated his short program to Frédéric Chopin's Ballade No. 1 in G minor and selected a medley from Andrew Lloyd Webber's musical The Phantom of the Opera for the free skate. The programs were choreographed by Jeffrey Buttle and Shae-Lynn Bourne, respectively, who created all short and free skate programs for Hanyu from 2014 onward. For Hanyu, the 2014–15 season was shaped by a series of injuries, starting with an accident in practice, where he hurt his back and was forced to withdraw from the 2014 Finlandia Trophy. In his first Grand Prix event at the Cup of China, he collided with Chinese skater Yan Han during the free skate warm-up, suffering bruises on his head and chin along with injuring his midriff, left thigh, and right leg. Despite his severe condition, he decided to compete in the free skate and managed to finish second overall behind Maxim Kovtun from Russia. At the NHK Trophy, he came in fourth, securing his place at the Grand Prix Final by one of the slimmest margins of 0.15 points. At the Final, he successfully defended his title with a new season's best score of 288.16, finishing 34.26 points ahead of silver medalist Javier Fernández. In December, Hanyu competed at the 2014–15 Japan Championships, placing first in both segments and winning his third consecutive national title. However, he was forced to withdraw from the exhibition gala due to abdominal pain. He was diagnosed with a tubal residual disease and had to undergo surgery on his bladder, being hospitalized for two weeks and resting for another month. His series of injuries continued with a sprain of his right ankle that forced him to stay in Japan until the 2015 World Championships, where he finished second behind Fernández by less than three points. In April, Hanyu competed for the first time at the ISU World Team Trophy, where he placed first in both competition segments, earning 24 points to help Team Japan win the bronze medal behind Team USA (gold) and Team Russia (silver).

2015–16 season: Back-to-back world records

For the 2015–16 season, Hanyu returned to his short program Ballade No. 1 and selected the soundtrack of the films Onmyōji and Onmyōji II by Shigeru Umebayashi for the free skate, portraying the Japanese philosopher and astronomer Abe no Seimei. He started the season by winning gold at the 2015 Autumn Classic, finishing 36 points ahead of silver medalist Nam Nguyen. However, in his first Grand Prix event at Skate Canada, he placed sixth in the short program after invalidating two jumping passes, finishing second overall behind Patrick Chan. Hanyu had been struggling with his short program layout throughout the previous season that included a quad toe loop and triple Lutz-triple toe loop combination in the second half. While his coach Brian Orser suggested a more "conservative" change, Hanyu decided to add another quad, stating: "I thought by the time of the Pyeongchang Olympics, you cannot win without a short program that includes two quads with difficult entries and exits—plus excellent footwork, spins, and presentation. As the reigning Olympic champion, I want to be absolutely dominant." The offensive strategy earned him a series of back-to-back world records within two weeks: At the 2015 NHK Trophy, he set new highest scores of 106.33 in the short program, 216.07 in the free skate, and 322.40 in the combined total, becoming the first skater to score above 200 and 300 points in the two segments, respectively. It was the first free skate performance of Hanyu's competitive career with all-positive grades of execution, featuring three quadruple jumps and two triple Axels. At the 2015–16 Grand Prix Final in Barcelona, he broke his own records in all three segments with 110.95 points in the short program, 219.48 in the free skate, and 330.43 overall, becoming the first man to win the Grand Prix Final for three consecutive seasons. He finished 37.48 points ahead of Javier Fernández, breaking the record of the largest victory margin at the Grand Prix Final, which was held by Evgeni Plushenko with 35.10 points in 2004. At the Japan Championships, Hanyu won his fourth consecutive national title after placing first in both segments. However, a lingering pain in his left foot worsened throughout the season, threatening his participation at the 2016 World Championships in Boston. At the event, he managed to skate another clean short program of 110.56 points, but faltered in the free skate, placing second overall behind Fernández. It was subsequently announced that Hanyu had been diagnosed with a Lisfranc injury in his left foot, forcing him off ice for two months.

2016–17 season: Second world title

In the 2016–17 season, Hanyu skated to the song "Let's Go Crazy" by Prince in the short program and a medley of "Asian Dream Song" and "View of Silence" by Joe Hisaishi, titled Hope and Legacy, in the free skate. He opened the season with a win at the 2016 Autumn Classic, becoming the first skater to successfully land a quadruple loop jump in competition. After a rough performance at Skate Canada with a second-place finish behind Patrick Chan, Hanyu and Orser had a debate on the approach for the next competitions. While Orser described the performances as a "skeleton of the [planned] choreography" and pleaded to work on the "total package", Hanyu was convinced that landing his jumps was the key to a well-rounded program. The strategy paid off with a win at the NHK Trophy, surpassing the 300 mark with a total score of 301.47. At the 2016–17 Grand Prix Final in Marseille, he placed first the short program with a season's best score of 106.53. In the free skate, he made mistakes on three jumping passes, placing third in the segment, but his advantage from the short program was enough to stay in first overall, becoming the first male single skater to win four consecutive Grand Prix Finals. After contracting the flu, Hanyu was forced to withdraw from the Japan Championships, missing the event for the first time. At the 2017 Four Continents Championships, he placed third in the short program after turning his quad Salchow into a double, a jump that had caused him issues throughout the season. He fought back with a strong free skate, placing first in the segment and scoring a new season's best of 303.71 points in the combined total. However, he finished second behind American Nathan Chen by about four points, taking the silver medal for a third time. At the World Championships, he moved up from fifth place after the short program to first with a clean free skate performance that featured four quadruple jumps and two triple Axels. He scored a new world record of 223.20 points in the segment and won his second world title, finishing ahead of his compatriot Shoma Uno (silver) and Jin Boyang from China (bronze). The event marked the first time that all three medalists scored above 300 points. In July 2022, Hanyu named the free skate performance of Hope and Legacy as the one that he thought would represent him best and was the most perfectly executed of his competitive career. At the 2017 World Team Trophy, the final competition of the season, he came in seventh place after an error-filled short program, but placed first in the free skating, becoming the first skater to complete three quadruple jumps in the second half of a skating program. He contributed 18 points to the team score and won gold with Team Japan.

2017–18 season: Second Olympic title

For the Olympic season, Hanyu returned to his short program Ballade No. 1 and free skate Seimei from the 2015–16 season. At the 2017 CS Autumn Classic, he scored a new world record of 112.72 points in the short program; at the Rostelecom Cup, he landed his first successful quadruple Lutz jump in international competition. However, due to mistakes, he finished second at both events behind Javier Fernández and Nathan Chen, respectively. In November, Hanyu was scheduled to compete at the NHK Trophy, but injured a lateral ligament in his right ankle after a fall on a quad Lutz in practice and was forced to withdraw from all remaining competitions of the year. At the 2018 Winter Olympics in Pyeongchang, he placed first in the short program with a new Olympic record of 111.68 points. In the free skating, he missed a jump combination and stumbled on his final triple Lutz, placing second in the segment, but it was enough to stay in first overall ahead of Shoma Uno (silver) and Javier Fernández (bronze), scoring another Olympic record of 317.85 points in the combined total. With his win, Hanyu became the first male single skater in 66 years to successfully defend his Olympic title since Dick Button in 1952. Upon the conclusion of the Olympics, he announced the quadruple Axel as his next career goal, a jump that hadn't been landed in competition until then. In order to allow his injured ankle to recover, he decided to withdraw from the World Championships, but remained first in the world standings for a fifth consecutive time at the end of the 2017–18 season.

Third Olympic cycle (2018–2022)
2018–19 season: Records in new judging system
For the 2018–19 season, Hanyu selected his programs with the thought to pay tribute to the skating idols of his childhood. His short program to "" by Raúl Di Blasio was dedicated to American skater Johnny Weir who had used the piece for his free skate in the 2004–05 season. Hanyu's new free skate program Origin, a medley of the pieces "Art on Ice" and "Magic Stradivarius" by Edvin Marton, was a homage to Russian Evgeni Plushenko who had skated to the music in his free skate Tribute to Nijinsky in 2003–04. Regarding his program choices, Hanyu remarked: "I am satisfied that as a result [of my Olympic success] I have been released from the pressure that I have to produce results. I think and feel that I can skate for myself from now on. I want to go back to my skating origins."

Hanyu opened the season with a win at the 2018 Autumn Classic, but expressed dissatisfaction with his performances, pledging to improve in the next competitions. At the Grand Prix of Helsinki, he set highest scores in all segments under the new +5/-5 GOE judging system, earning 106.69 points in the short program, 190.43 in the free skate, and 297.12 points in the combined total. He also became the first skater to land a quad toe loop-triple Axel jump sequence in competition, winning the event by about 40 points over Michal Březina. At the Rostelecom Cup in Moscow, Hanyu upped the short program record to 110.53 points, but on the following day, he re-injured his right ankle in practice after falling on a quad loop. Yet he opted to compete, aided by painkillers, and managed to place first in all segments, winning gold at both of his Grand Prix assignments for the first time. After the competition, Hanyu admitted: "I thought about withdrawing because of the injury, but it is my choice. I really wanted to skate this program in Russia." Due to the injured ligaments and tendons in his right foot, he was forced to withdraw from the Grand Prix Final and Japan Championships, taking about three weeks of rest and another month of rehabilitation. At the 2019 World Championships in Saitama, Hanyu placed third in the short program after turning his opening quad Salchow into a double, but came back with a strong free skate, becoming the first skater to surpass the 200 and 300 marks in the new judging system with 206.10 points in the free skate and 300.97 in total. However, he finished second behind Nathan Chen who bested both scores later in the event. Similar to his preparations for the Olympics, Hanyu had relied on painkillers before and during the competition to make jumping possible. Due to the injury, he was forced to withdraw from the season's final event, the World Team Trophy.

2019–20 season: Achieving Super Slam

In 2019–20, Hanyu returned to the short program "" and free skate Origin, and launched the new season with a solid win at the 2019 Autumn Classic. Brian Orser praised his student, noting that he has "never seen him at this time of the year to be so focused." In the Grand Prix series, Hanyu won his first gold medal at Skate Canada, scoring new personal bests of 212.99 in the free skate and 322.59 in the combined total. He placed first with a new largest victory margin of 59.82 points ahead of Nam Nguyen, improving his own record of 55.97 points from 2015. Hanyu expressed his satisfaction with the performance, feeling reaffirmed about the image of skating he was aiming for, and added: "For the first in a long time, I genuinely felt being able to win against myself." At the NHK Trophy, he captured another gold with a total score above 300 and more than 55 points ahead of silver medalist Kevin Aymoz. At the Grand Prix Final, Hanyu went into the short program without company due to a delayed arrival of his coach Ghislain Briand. In his performance, he missed a mandatory jump combination, placing second in the segment and trailing Nathan Chen by about 13 points. In the free skate, Hanyu landed five quadruple jumps in one program for the first time in his career, including his first attempt on a quad Lutz since 2017, but missed a planned triple Axel-triple Axel sequence, finishing second overall behind Chen by more than 43 points.

Competing at his first Japanese championships since the 2016–17 season, Hanyu placed first in the short program, 5.01 points ahead of Shoma Uno. Several jump errors in the free skate saw him place third in that segment, behind Uno and Yuma Kagiyama, and win the silver medal overall. It was Hanyu's first loss to Uno. Heading into the Four Continents Championships in Seoul, Hanyu opted to return to his Ballade No. 1 (Chopin) program and his "Seimei" program from prior seasons. Referencing the 2018 Winter Olympics which were held in Pyeongchang, Hanyu noted that while he wanted to win a gold medal once again in South Korea, he wanted to showcase and focus on his own style of figure skating even more. In the short program, Hanyu broke his previous world record with 111.82 points. Hanyu called it "the most perfect performance I've ever done." Despite errors on two of his quad attempts in the free skate, he won that segment as well, taking the gold medal overall with 299.42 points.  Hanyu's victory on February 9, made him the first and only male singles skater to win all of the major ISU championship events at the junior and senior levels, a feat known as the Super Slam, previously only achieved by five other competitors in the other three skating disciplines. He was assigned to compete at the World Championships in Montreal, but these were canceled as a result of the coronavirus pandemic. At the ISU Skating Awards in 2020, Hanyu was nominated for Best Costume and Most Valuable Skater for the 2019–2020 season, and proceeded to win the latter.

2020–21 season: Seventh world medal
On August 28, Hanyu announced that he would skip the Grand Prix series, citing the risk of COVID-19 for himself, the competition staff, and for his fans who would gather to support him. Despite feeling "conflicted" over whether he should have competed or not as COVID-19 continued and practicing without his coaching team, Hanyu decided to compete in Japanese championships, which doubled as the final qualifier for the upcoming World Championships in Stockholm. He placed first in the short program (103.53 points) and the free skate (215.83 points) with all positive grades of execution on jumping passes and won his fifth national figure skating title with a total score of 319.36 points.

The 2021 World Championships were to be the first direct competition between Hanyu and Nathan Chen since the 2019–20 Grand Prix Final. Hanyu placed first in the short program with a solid performance, 6.02 points ahead of compatriot Yuma Kagiyama. In the free skate, Hanyu opened his program with two quadruple jumps and a triple Axel but received negative grades of execution for all three of them. Scoring 182.20 points, he placed fourth in the free skate and third overall, behind Chen and Kagiyama. It was the first competition Hanyu had placed below second since 2014. On the following day, Hanyu confirmed the report of his asthma attack by overseas media. He stated that he felt a little painful after finishing the free skate, and explained: "There were few small troubles that kept stacking up ... However, if asked whether that was what led to the huge mistake (in the free skate), I don't think it was as big of a miss as it was in terms of the miss in the score." Hanyu's placement combined with Kagiyama's qualified three berths for Japanese men at the 2022 Winter Olympics. Hanyu competed as part of Team Japan for the 2021 World Team Trophy. He placed second in both the short program and the free skate, only behind Nathan Chen. He achieved a personal season's best score in both the short program and the free skate with 107.12 and 193.76 points respectively and earned a total of 22 points to help his team take home the bronze medal.

2021–22 season: Sixth national title and third Olympics

Hanyu confirmed his plans to compete in the 2021–22 Olympic season, and was scheduled to compete at the 2021 NHK Trophy and 2021 Rostelecom Cup in November for the 2021–22 Grand Prix series. On November 4, 2021, the Japan Skating Federation announced Hanyu's withdrawal from the NHK Trophy due to an injury in his right ankle ligament during a fall in practice. The JSF subsequently announced his withdrawal from the Rostelecom Cup prior to the event, but said that he would remain in consideration for the Olympic team.

Hanyu made his season debut at the 2021–22 Japan Figure Skating Championships, placing first in both the short program and free skate, winning his sixth Japanese National title, tying Takeshi Honda's record of most national titles in the last 50 years. He also attempted a quadruple Axel for the first time during the free skate, although it was downgraded to a triple Axel with a two-footed landing. Hanyu was assigned to represent Japan at the 2022 Winter Olympics and the 2022 World Championships.

At the 2022 Winter Olympics, Hanyu missed his opening quadruple Salchow jump in the short program due to a hole in the ice and placed eighth with 95.15 points, qualifying him for the free skate. The score was his lowest in the segment since the 2019 World Championships. In the free skate, he fell twice in his first two opening jumps, a quadruple Axel and a quad Salchow. His quad Axel attempt is the first that was not downgraded to triple Axel. Other than these two mistakes, he delivered a clean skate, placing third in the free skate and fourth place overall with a total score of 283.21 points, behind fellow Japanese compatriot and bronze medalist Shoma Uno. Following his free skate, Hanyu confirmed in a press conference that he had re-injured his right ankle in practice the day before the free skate, but since it was the Olympics and not a normal competition, he chose to compete on painkillers instead of withdrawing. On March 1, 2022, the Japan Skating Federation announced Hanyu's withdrawal from the 2022 World Championships due to the unhealed injury.

Professional skating career

At a press conference on July 19, 2022, Hanyu announced his decision to "step away" from competitive figure skating at amateur level and turn professional, stating that "he had achieved everything he could achieve" and would no longer "seek those kinds of evaluations." He also stated his intention to continue pursuing his "ideal skating" and dream of completing the quadruple Axel as a professional athlete. Nikkei Asia noted that Hanyu's exit from the competitive circuit "marks the end of an era". Juliet Macur of The New York Times remarked that "we may never see another skater like Yuzuru Hanyu". Numerous sports figures from and outside figure skating reacted to Hanyu's announcement with gratitude and praise, including Japanese gymnast Kōhei Uchimura, baseballer Shohei Ohtani, and tennis player Naomi Osaka.

Hanyu later opened accounts on social media, having long eschewed it for years, that are mainly managed by staff. He stated his intention to show his skating through his YouTube channel and increase opportunities for everyone to watch it, including those who are unable to attend ice shows and live overseas, but that he did not have plans to make videos about his daily life. On August 10, Hanyu live-streamed an open practice session on his channel, where he performed his past free skate programs, including a flawless performance of Seimei with the same elements as he had performed at the 2018 Winter Olympics.

In November and December 2022, Hanyu held his first ice show tour as a professional figure skater, titled Prologue, in Yokohama and Hachinohe. The solo show of 90 minutes runtime was produced and directed by Hanyu himself, featuring a selection of his past competition and exhibition programs. The final shows at each venue were aired live on national television and livestreamed in select movie theaters nationwide. On December 5, 2022, Hanyu announced his second solo ice show with the title Gift, which was held at Tokyo Dome, one of Japan's largest entertainment venues, on February 26, 2023.

On January 9, 2023, it was announced that Hanyu will be the chairman of a new ice show titled Notte Stellata to send out hope from the disaster area. The show will be held on the twelfth anniversary of the Great East Japan Earthquake at Sekisui Heim Super Arena, Miyagi which was used as a morgue after the 2011 earthquake.

On February 20, 2023, Hanyu was announced to be appearing in all ten shows of Stars on Ice Japan Tour 2023 scheduled to be held from March 30 to April 9 at Osaka, Ōshū, and Yokohama. On March 3, 2023, it was announced that Hanyu will take part in Fantasy on Ice Tour 2023 appearing in all twelve shows scheduled from May 26 to June 25 at Makuhari, Miyagi, Niigata, and Kobe.

Skating technique and style

Hanyu is regarded by analysts as an accomplished skater known for his high-level technical elements as well as mature and versatile artistry. His performance is often characterized as "the perfect combination of skills, strength and elegance", tending to "[blur] rigid gender lines". According to four-time Olympic medalist Evgeni Plushenko, Hanyu had a "decided edge over other skaters in the completeness of his performance—spins, skating skills, transitions between jumps and musical interpretation". Two-time world champion Stephane Lambiel described him as "the most complete athlete in figure skating, probably ever."

Hanyu is known for his ability to generate skating speed "out of nowhere" and cover long distances with only a few strokes. At the 2021–22 Japan Championships, he managed to perform a clean short program without using consecutive crossovers and reduce the number of basic skating movements to a minimum. This is a feat that has long been considered near impossible, as stated by former competitive skater John Misha Petkevich in his book Figure Skating: Championship Techniques from 1989: "Without a doubt, crossovers are the staple of every skater. Not only are they used to negotiate corners, but they are also used to pick up speed. Skating without crossovers would be virtually unthinkable."

The ability to accelerate with a few strokes allows Hanyu to execute his jumps from a variety of difficult entries. Notable are the backward counter turn, twizzle, and spread eagle into his signature triple Axel jump. Hanyu is also known for his strong vaulting technique with minimal pre-rotation on the ice at the take-off, achieving trajectories of impressive size. With a height of 70 centimeters and covering a distance of 3.62 meters, his triple Axel was the largest measured jump in the men's short program at the 2019 World Championships. In 2018, Hanyu's triple Axel from the 2018 Winter Olympics was used as a demonstration example by the ISU for the GOE judging criteria "very good height and very good length" as well as "steps before the jump, unexpected or creative entry". Despite the complex preceding steps and big trajectory, he manages to land his jumps smoothly and increase his skating speed from take-off to landing. With the toe loop, Salchow, loop, and Lutz, Hanyu has successfully executed four different types of quadruple jumps in the course of his competitive career. He stated his preference for edge jumps, and notably featured all three types in his short program of the 2016–17 season.

Hanyu is able to execute the layback Biellmann and doughnut camel spin, which are more commonly seen in women's singles and known for their difficulty among male skaters due to the high flexibility required in spine, hips, and shoulders. Other signature moves include the layback Ina Bauer, hydroblading, and the side lunge. Overall, Hanyu's technical elements stand out for their high quality of execution, having received a total of 29 maximum scores in international competition, covering all four types of required elements in the men's singles discipline: jumps, spins, steps, and choreographic sequences. Beyond that, his elements are noted for their seamless embedding into the choreography and his movements for their precise timing with the music, the latter being awarded a perfect 10.00 in the interpretation component at the 2021–22 Japan Championships.

Hanyu's programs cover a variety of different music genres, including classical pieces, modern pop rock, musicals, and traditional Japanese music. He notably portrayed the historical Japanese figures Abe no Seimei and Uesugi Kenshin in his free skate programs at the 2018 and 2022 Winter Olympics. He also dedicated various exhibition programs to the victims of the 2011 Tōhoku earthquake and tsunami and performed them as live music collaborations at shows like Fantasy on Ice among others. Hanyu is known to be involved in all aspects of his programs, from the music selection and editing process to the costume design and choreography. As his choreographer Shae-Lynn Bourne stated, "He knows what costume he wants. He knows what jump order he wants. He makes a lot of the decisions on his own. You can't say 'no' to that ever. You know, with music especially, because he is going to skate with conviction."

Figure skaters Hanyu looked up to while growing up are Evgeni Plushenko and Johnny Weir. With his competitive programs for the 2018–19 season, he paid homage to the two skaters by skating to "Otoñal" by Raúl di Blasio as well as "Art on Ice" and "Magic Stradivarius" by Edvin Marton, which had been used by Weir and Plushenko, respectively, in their programs. At the press conference of the 2018 Winter Olympics, Hanyu also mentioned Stephane Lambiel, Javier Fernández, and Dick Button as the skaters who had influenced him as a skater.

Former coaches and choreographers

Before the 2011–12 season, most of Hanyu's career was guided by Nanami Abe in Sendai. After winning bronze at the 2012 World Figure Skating Championships, he switched coaches to Brian Orser, who is known for guiding Kim Yuna to gold at the 2010 Winter Olympics. In switching, Hanyu continued to attend high school in Sendai but made frequent trips to Toronto Cricket, Skating and Curling Club  (TCSCC), where Orser works as a skating instructor. Hidehito Ito, the figure skating director at the Japanese Skating Federation, said the change was necessary to "challenge" Hanyu and "raise the level [of his skating] more". During his time at TCSCC, Hanyu was also coached by Tracy Wilson and Ghislain Briand. On his experience working as a jump specialist with Hanyu since 2014, Briand stated that he was given a lot of room: "I have to admit [Hanyu] is probaby the first athlete who really recognizes what I'm doing with him." After Hanyu turned professional, Briand stated that he would continue to work with him when he was needed.

During Hanyu's junior career, all of his programs were choreographed by Nanami Abe. Starting from his 2012–2013 season, his programs were choreographed by others, with Shae-Lynn Bourne and Jeffrey Buttle as frequent collaborators. Hanyu has also worked with Canadian choreographer David Wilson for several years, including his free skate program for the 2014 Winter Olympics, before collaborated on many exhibition programs. Other choreographers for his exhibition programs include Kurt Browning, Kenji Miyamoto, and former coach Nanami Abe.

In 2021, due to travel restrictions related to the coronavirus pandemic, Hanyu started to train alone in Sendai with some remote consultation from his coaches. Despite the difficulties of training alone, Hanyu found that it had been a good opportunity to learn how to control and analyze himself, which led him not return to Canada until he turned professional and made Ice Rink Sendai his training base again. During that period none of his coaches accompanied him to any competition except the 2021 World Championships. Hanyu also opted to receive remote choreography for his programs ever since and has contributed significantly to the choreography of his programs in the 2020–21 season.

Public life
Endorsements and ambassadorships

Hanyu has appeared in many commercials and advertising campaigns over the years. In 2013, Hanyu, alongside fellow Japanese figure skater Daisuke Takahashi, became the 2014 Sochi Winter Olympics campaign ambassador for P&G's global "Proud Sponsor of Moms" campaign. He also signed an affiliation contract with All Nippon Airways which ended when he turned professional in 2022 but he remained sponsored by the company. From February 8 to 23, 2014, Hanyu endorsed ANA's new line of flight attendant outfits, which were designed by Prabal Gurung and appeared in a TV commercial for their 2018 Pyeongchang Winter Olympics "Hello Blue Hello Future" campaign. In September 2014, Hanyu starred in a TV commercial for Capcom's new video game Monster Hunter 4G and endorsed Lotte's Ghana milk chocolate with Mao Asada, singer Airi Matsui, and actresses Suzu Hirose and Tao Tsuchiya, in following years he also endorsed Lotte's Xylitol Whites and GUM FOR THE GAME.

Hanyu has also worked with other brands such as Ajinomoto endorsing their sport nutritional products Amino Vital and nutritional meals along with other athletes like Uta Abe, bath salts Bathclin Kikiyu, bedding products Nishikawa Sangyo co., and Phiten for their Aqua-Titanium sports socks and line of Rakuwa nylon-coated necklaces and bracelets including Hanyu's inspired 'Wings Gold' models. In 2019, Hanyu became the ambassador for Citizen in China, Hong Kong, and Macau, as well as the global ambassador of the Sekkisei series by Kosé. He was later appointed as the global "muse" of the Sekkisei Miyabi brand in 2020. In October 2021, Hanyu was chosen as a face of Towa Pharmaceutical co. appearing in a TV commercial with veteran actress Tetsuko Kuroyanagi and endorsed ANA's new teleportation services "avatarin".

In 2013 and 2021, Hanyu was appointed as the model for Miyagi Prefecture Police's traffic safety poster aiming to encourage compliance with traffic rules and spread awareness of safe driving. According to an official in March 2021, Hanyu was chosen because "he embodies sportsmanship".

In June 2021, Hanyu was appointed as the ambassador of the world's first official Paralympics game The Pegasus Dream Tour, making his video game debut with his avatar appearing in the game. According to the representative of the game's developer company, Hanyu was chosen because "he is an athlete as well as a person who has artistry in his way of life".

Since April 2014, Hanyu has been acting as the tourism ambassador of Sendai and featured in the city's tourism posters as well as tourist guidebooks.

Philanthropy

Since the 2011 Tōhoku earthquake and tsunami, Hanyu has been an advocate for and supporter of various campaigns to help earthquake victims, as he was also directly affected by the disaster, stating: "When the earthquake hit, I was on the ice at my home rink in Sendai". Shortly after the disaster, he and other skaters skated in ice shows to raise money for the victims, raising a total of more than $150,000. He also sold his personal belongings at the show, fundraising an additional ¥2,954,323 ($35,387).

Hanyu donated his 2014 Olympic gold medal 6 million yen ($55,000) prize money as well as his 2018 Olympic gold medal 10 million yen ($92,000) prize money received from the Japan Skating Federation and Japanese Olympic Committee to Sendai and Miyagi Prefecture to help with the reconstruction of the disaster areas. He also has been helping his home rink Ice Rink Sendai, rendered unusable after the disaster, by donating all the royalties and part of the proceeds of his autobiography series. It was revealed, in 2021, that a total of ¥31,442,143 ($286,000) had been donated to the rink.

In September 2014, Hanyu was appointed as the Tsunami Disaster Prevention Ambassador for one year participating in activities to spread tsunami disaster prevention public awareness. In February 2015, Hanyu became the spokesman for reconstruction efforts led by the Japanese Red Cross Society. He also lent his image as the spokesman for the Red Cross' "Hatachi no Kenketsu" donation campaign where he starred in the promotional video with patients. In March 2019, he donated a pair of figure skates to an online charity auction which raised 7.12 million yen ($64,000) for the disaster area reconstruction. He also collaborated with Line Corporation supervising the creation of "Yuzuru Hanyu 3.11 Smile Stamp" which went on sale with all revenues donated to the Nippon Foundation's "Special Fund for Disaster Reconstruction" to support acts for reconstruction and future disaster preparation. On August 21, 2019, a poster of Hanyu with the protagonist of the anime Yowamushi Pedal was released to promote Tour de Tohoku, an annual charity cycling event held to support the cause. He appeared in five of the nine posters being released. In 2021, marking the 10th anniversary of Tohoku earthquake and tsunami, Hanyu organized the "Together, Forward" exhibition that traces his footsteps during that difficult period, revisiting the affected people and places. The exhibition is held in multiple Japanese cities in an effort to remind everyone of the importance of disaster prevention and preparation.

In cooperation with Yomiuri Shimbun, a free entry exhibition of Hanyu's photos, costumes, and medals was held offline in multiple locations in Japan in 2018 and 2022 and online in 2020. A total sum of more than 150 million yen was donated from the sales of the exhibition's official goods. Around 42 million yen was donated in 2018 to support victims of the Great East Japan Earthquake and other disasters and around 27 million yen was donated in 2020 to the National Corona Medical Welfare Support Fund. The donation from the 2022 exhibition that exceeded 85 million yen was donated to the Yomiuri Light and Love Foundation which was used to create a disaster relief fund in case of any large-scale disaster that occurs in Japan in the future. In February 2023, it was announced that 10 million yen from the fund will be donated for relief and reconstruction efforts in areas affected by the 2023 Turkey–Syria earthquake in Turkey.

Hanyu also regularly participates in Nippon TV's annual charity program 24-Hour Television since 2014, holding special ice shows and visiting victims in disaster areas. In 2014, he held a one-night ice show to bring in donations. In 2015, he and Hey! Say! JUMP member Yuri Chinen designed "Chari-T-shirts" for the program under the slogan "To connect: a smile beyond time". The shirts were to be sold with the profits given to charity. He also visited earthquake-affected areas in Fukushima and Ishinomaki, interviewing the victims as part of the program segment.

Film and television

Hanyu served as a judge on Japan's popular New Year's Eve music show Kōhaku Uta Gassen twice, in 2015 and 2022. He made his on-screen debut as Date Shigemura, a samurai lord, in the 2016 movie, The Magnificent Nine.

Hanyu released two video albums compiling some of his competitive career performances, the first titled Time of Awakening was released on May 21, 2014, including performances till the 2014 Winter Olympics. The album became the first from an athlete to top Oricon's DVD weekly chart since its establishment in 1999 and peaked at number 3 on the Blu-ray weekly chart after selling 44,000 copies in its first week. The second album titled Time of Evolution was released on September 15, 2019, including performances from the 2015–16 season to the 2018 winter Olympics. The album became the first sports-related work to top Oricon's Blu-ray weekly chart and peaked at number 2 on the DVD weekly chart after selling over 38,000 copies in its first week.

On December 18, 2015, NHK Enterprises released the DVD of The Flowers Bloom on Ice, featuring behind-the-scenes and interviews with Shizuka Arakawa and Yuzuru Hanyu as they skate at the ice show together to support reconstruction after the 2011 Japan earthquake.

In 2018, Hanyu's first self-produced show Continues with Wings was live broadcast on TV Asahi CS and live-streamed at 66 movie theaters throughout Japan. He is also one of the lead cast members besides Stéphane Lambiel and Johnny Weir at the annual touring ice show Fantasy on Ice, having participated in all editions of the tour since its revival in 2010 with one exception, having missed the shows in 2016 due to rehabilitation from a ligament injury.

Books and magazines

Hanyu released the first two parts of his autobiography series Blue Flames and Blue Flames II in 2012 and 2016 respectively. As of 2023, the two parts have sold over 350,000 copies. In February 2023, the third part Blue Flames III was released and sold over 25,000 copies in the first week.

Hanyu released various photobooks cooperating with multiple publishers and photographers. His first photo book, Yuzuru, was released on October 4, 2014, selling over 23,000 copies in the first week. It ranked first in Oricon's weekly charts for photos and sport-related categories, as well as second in the chart's general books category.

On September 25, 2015, Yuzuru Hanyu Sayings was released containing pictures and quotes by the skater. The book topped Amazon's reservation sales rankings. On October 2, 2022, a second part of the book was released. On March 1, 2018, the book Live Your Dream including a collection of interviews with Hanyu from 2015 to 2018 was released. The book sold 28,000 copies ranking third in Oricon's weekly general books chart. On October 11, 2018, Yuzuru Hanyu Soul Program was released. The book includes photos and descriptions of programs performed by Hanyu. In November, 2022, Yuzuru Hanyu Amateur Era Complete Record was released. The book looks back on Hanyu's competitive skating life including press photos and competition results.

Hanyu has graced the cover of numerous Japanese sports magazines as well as well-known magazines, such as An An and Aera. Hanyu's special edition of Aera magazine The Driving Force of the Leap released in October, 2022 sold over 29,000 copies in the first week topping the Oricon's weekly general books chart.

Personal life and education
Since Hanyu began carrying a Winnie-the-Pooh tissue box to competitions in 2010, his supporters and fans eventually made it a custom to acknowledge the end of his performances by throwing Pooh bears onto the ice instead of other kinds of stuffed toys or gifts, which has been a tradition in figure skating. Hanyu donates the bears to disadvantaged children at local hospitals and charities surrounding the arena that hosted the event.

Hanyu studied at Nanakita Elementary and Junior High School. In 2013, Hanyu graduated from  then entered an e-school program on Human Information Science at Waseda University. He attended the school from his training base in Canada. In August 2020, it was revealed that his graduation thesis summarizes how 3D motion capture technology could be used in figure skating, and in particular its potential for use in figure skating judging. One area of research he did is recording and analyzing his movement while doing the triple Axel jump off-ice which he hopes can be used to improve the skills of athletes and AI judging. He officially graduated from the university in September 2020, but was unable to attend the ceremony due to the COVID-19 pandemic in Japan. In March 2021, a bulletin paper summarizing his graduation thesis was published in the Waseda Journal of Human Sciences.

Accolades and impact

Many sport writers, commentators, and skaters have made the case for Hanyu as the greatest skater in history, particularly after his second Olympic victory, for his well-rounded skills, longevity at the top in a highly competitive field, and ability to deliver under pressure. His decision to attempt the quadruple Axel at the 2022 Winter Olympics instead of taking a conservative option was seen to have strengthened his status.

Hanyu is regarded as part of the vanguard of the quad revolution in men's figure skating. He was one of the few skaters who challenged quadruple Salchow at the 2014 Olympics. He is credited as the first figure skater to successfully land a quadruple loop in competition after performing it in the short program at the Autumn Classic International in Montreal, Canada on September 30, 2016. He is also the only skater who has landed a quadruple toe loop-triple Axel sequence in competition, doing so for the first time at Grand Prix Helsinki 2018. Hanyu is also the first skater to land a quadruple toe loop-Euler-triple flip combination at Skate Canada 2019.  At the 2022 Winter Olympics, Hanyu made his first attempt on the quadruple Axel in an international competition. Despite falling on the jump, he received the base value of quad Axel before being reduced for under-rotation. It was the closest quad Axel attempt in a competition until American Ilia Malinin successfully landed one at the 2022 CS U.S. Classic, who cited Hanyu as his inspiration to attempt the jump. However, in regards to the ongoing debate on jumps versus artistry in the sport, Hanyu spoke through an interpreter after his second Olympic win in 2018:

In recognition of his achievements, Hanyu has been awarded numerous accolades, including the People's Honor Award in 2018 becoming the first figure skater and the youngest recipient of the award. He was also awarded the Medal of Honour with Purple Ribbon in 2014 and 2018, and received two monuments depicting his trademark poses performed at the 2014 and 2018 Olympics in his hometown of Sendai. He was also nominated for the Laureus World Sports Award for Comeback of the Year in 2019 becoming the first figure skater to be nominated for the award, and was awarded the Most Valuable Skater of the 2019–20 season at the inaugural ISU Skating Awards in 2020. In 2021, he was awarded the Azusa Ono Memorial Award, the most prestigious award that can be conferred to students and given to those recognized as a model, from Waseda University. On October 11, 2022, he was announced as a recipient of the Kikuchi Kan Prize for his accomplishments as a competitive figure skater as well as his attitude of "continuing to take on challenges". 

Hanyu was featured in prestigious lists, such as Forbes 30 Under 30 Asia 2018 as well as ESPN's World Fame 100 and The Dominant 20, and has received multiple awards and ranked high in multiple lists and popularity polls from various media outlets. In 2022, he placed sixth in the list of most-searched athletes on Google Search worldwide, behind Novak Djokovic, Rafael Nadal, Serena Williams (all tennis), Manti Te'o (American football), and Shaun White (snowboard).

World records and other achievements

Throughout his career, Hanyu has broken world records nineteen times – seven times under the current +5/-5 GOE system and twelve times in the old +3/-3 GOE system. He holds the historical world record in all three competition segments: the short program, free skating, and combined total score.

Programs

Competitive highlights

See alsoYuzuru Hanyu seriesYuzuru Hanyu Olympic seasons
Ice shows produced by Yuzuru Hanyu
List of career achievements by Yuzuru Hanyu
List of programs and publications of Yuzuru HanyuOther'List of Olympic medalists in figure skating
Axel jump
Fantasy on IceThe Magnificent Nine''

Notes and references

Citations

Books and magazines cited

Further reading

External links

Yuzuru Hanyu at the Japan Skating Federation (archived March 29, 2022) (Japanese)
Yuzuru Hanyu (athlete profile) at All Nippon Airways (archived June 7, 2021)

Yuzuru Hanyu database at SkatingScores.com

!colspan=3 style="border-top: 5px solid #78FF78;"|World Record Holders

!colspan=3 style="border-top:5px solid #78FF78;"|Historical World Record Holders (before season 2018–19)

Yuzuru Hanyu
1994 births
Living people
Sportspeople from Sendai
Japanese expatriate sportspeople in Canada
Japanese male single skaters
Olympic figure skaters of Japan
Olympic gold medalists for Japan
Olympic medalists in figure skating
Medalists at the 2014 Winter Olympics
Medalists at the 2018 Winter Olympics
Figure skaters at the 2014 Winter Olympics
Figure skaters at the 2018 Winter Olympics
Figure skaters at the 2022 Winter Olympics
World Figure Skating Championships medalists
Four Continents Figure Skating Championships medalists
World Junior Figure Skating Championships medalists
Season-end world number one figure skaters
Season's world number one figure skaters
Fantasy on Ice main cast members
People's Honour Award winners
Recipients of the Medal with Purple Ribbon
Waseda University alumni